The seventeenth season of Food Paradise, an American food reality television series narrated by Jess Blaze Snider on the Travel Channel, premiered on March 11, 2018. First-run episodes of the series aired in the United States on the Travel Channel on Mondays at 10:00 p.m. EDT. The season contained 13 episodes and concluded airing on May 27, 2018.

Food Paradise features the best places to find various cuisines at food locations across America. Each episode focuses on a certain type of restaurant, such as "Diners", "Bars", "Drive-Thrus" or "Breakfast" places that people go to find a certain food specialty.

Episodes

Cruisin' the Coasts

Hook, Line & Dinner

Local Lowdown

Brew-Haha

Slice of Heaven

All You Can Meat

Fast Food Finds

Sights and Bites

Go Big or Go Hungry

The Comfort Zone

College Town Cravings

Hit the Road

Blast From the Past

References

External links
Food Paradise @Travelchannel.com

2018 American television seasons